Nearly 97% of the population of Karachi is Muslim. There is also a small number of Qadiyyani Non-Muslims. The Sunnis follow Hanafi fiqh while Shi'ites are predominantly Ithnā‘Ashariyyah in fiqh, with significant minority groups who follow Ismaili Fiqh, which is composed of Nizari (Aga Khanis), Mustaali, Dawoodi Bohra and Sulaymani fiqhs. The Sunni Hanafis are also known as Ahle-sunnat-wa Jamat Barelvi. The followers of Wahabism are divided into two sub divisions called Ahle-haddeth and Deobandi sects and both have their own mosques.

At the time of British East India Company conquest of Karachi on February 3, 1839 the population was predominantly Muslim. The British developed Karachi as a major port which attracted non-Muslims from rest of South Asia. At the time of independence of Pakistan on August 14, 1947, only half the population of Karachi was Muslim. The emigration of Hindus and Sikhs to India and the settlement of Muslim refugees in the city turned Karachi once again into a predominantly Muslim city.

See also
 Muhammad bin Qasim
 Religion in Karachi
 Demographics of Karachi
 Culture of Karachi
 Sufism in Karachi
 List of mosques in Karachi

References

Further reading
 The Political Ethnicity and the State of Pakistan

External links
DHA wants SHC to shut down temple built on residential plot